Charles Stephen Rogers (born March 28, 1942) was a British Columbia politician and cabinet minister from 1975 to 1991. Rogers ran for the leadership of the British Columbia Social Credit Party in the 1986 leadership race, but lost to Bill Vander Zalm.

He was born in Vancouver, British Columbia, the son of Forrest Rogers and Gwynneth Thomas, and was educated in Vernon and Vancouver. In 1967, Rogers married Margaret Wallace. He married his second wife Valerie Richards in 1991.Stephen has four children—two from both marriages.

He was elected as a Social Credit MLA in Vancouver South in 1975, 1979, 1983 and 1986.  His career culminated in serving as Speaker until 1991 when he returned to his career as an airline pilot with Air Canada. He retired from Air Canada in 2002.

Rogers was forced to resign from the position of Minister of Energy, Mines and Petroleum Resources in 1986 after it was disclosed that he was in a conflict of interest position involving a personal tax shelter investment. He resigned as Minister of Health later that same year just before he was charged with failure to disclose financial holdings as required by law. In 1987, Rogers resigned as Minister of the Environment following conflict of interest allegations related to a change in boundaries for Strathcona Provincial Park.

He ran as the Conservative Party of Canada candidate for the riding of Vancouver Quadra in the 2004 election and again in 2006, losing both times to Liberal Stephen Owen.

Rogers is a lifelong resident of Vancouver.

References

1942 births
Living people
Air Canada people
British Columbia Social Credit Party MLAs
Canadian aviators
Conservative Party of Canada candidates for the Canadian House of Commons
Members of the Executive Council of British Columbia
Politicians from Vancouver
Speakers of the Legislative Assembly of British Columbia
20th-century Canadian politicians
Commercial aviators